Sportservice Lorinser GmbH, founded 1930 in Winnenden, Germany, is a specialist tuning company for Mercedes-Benz.

History 

In 1935, Lorinser became Daimler AG's official reseller and takes over the maintenance and service responsibility for the Mercedes brand.

Erwin Lorinser, the founder, started to involve his son, Manfred, in the business during 1974 by appointing him as the Managing Director.

In 1976, Lorinser started tuning for Mercedes-Benz. In the same year, Lorinser's new car dealership was established in Winnenden.

By 1981, "Sportservice Lorinser GmbH" was enlisted in the Commercial Register.

Products 

 Engine Tuning
 Automotive Performance Products
 Exterior Styling

Records 

In 1996, Lorinser has been awarded with the certification according to the quality management norm DIN EN ISO 9002.

References

External links 

 

German companies established in 1930
Mercedes-Benz
Automotive companies of Germany